Sociology of language is the study of the relations between language and society. It is closely related to the field of sociolinguistics, which focuses on the effect of society on language. One of its longest and most prolific practitioners was Joshua Fishman, who was founding editor of the International Journal of the Sociology of Language, in addition to other major contributions. The sociology of language studies society in relation to language, whereas sociolinguistics studies language in relation to society. For the former, society is the object of study, whereas, for the latter, language is the object of study. In other words, sociolinguistics studies language and how it varies based on the user's sociological background, such as gender, ethnicity, and socioeconomic class. On the other hand, sociology of language (also known as macrosociolinguistics) studies society and how it is impacted by language. As Trent University professor of global politics Andreas Pickel states, "religion and other symbolic systems strongly shaping social practices and shaping political orientations are examples of the social significance such languages can have." The basic idea is that language reflects, among several other things, attitudes that speakers want to exchange or that just get reflected through language use. These attitudes of the speakers are the sociologist's information.

Sociology of language seeks to understand the way that social dynamics are affected by individual and group language use. According to National Taiwan University of Science and Technology Chair of Language Center Su-Chiao Chen, language is considered to be a social value within this field, which researches social groups for phenomena like multilingualism and lingual conflict. It has to do with who is 'authorized' to use what language, with whom and under what conditions. It has to do with how an individual or group identity is established by the language that they have available for them to use. It seeks to understand individual expression, which the investment in the linguistic tools that one has access to in order to bring oneself to other people.

See also

Anthropological linguistics
Code-mixing
Code-switching
Linguistic anthropology
Linguistic relativity
Language variety
Sociolinguistics

References

Further reading 
International Journal of the Sociology of Language. Mouton de Gruyter. Editor: Ofelia Garcia Otheguy. ISSN (Print) 0165-2516.

 
Syntax
Philosophy of language